Quadragesimo anno (Latin for "In the 40th Year") is an encyclical issued by Pope Pius XI on 15 May 1931, 40 years after Leo XIII's encyclical Rerum novarum, further developing Catholic social teaching. Unlike Leo XIII, who addressed the condition of workers, Pius XI discusses the ethical implications of the social and economic order. He describes the major dangers for human freedom and dignity arising from unrestrained capitalism, socialism, and communism as practised in Russia. He also calls for the reconstruction of the social order based on the principles of solidarity and subsidiarity.

Essential contributors to the formulation of the encyclical were the German Jesuits, Roman Catholic theologians and social philosophers Gustav Gundlach and the Königswinter Circle through one of its main authors Oswald von Nell-Breuning.

Changes since Rerum novarum

Pope Pius XI issued his encyclical exactly forty years after Rerum novarum. In the interim there were other papal statements from Leo XIII, and also the encyclical Singulari quadam of Pius X. Pius XI subtitled his encyclical Reconstruction of the Social Order. In the first part he reviews and applauds the encyclical of his predecessor. The Catholic Church can be credited with participating in the progress made and contributing to it. It developed a new social conscience.

Private property
The Church has a vital role in discussing social and economic issues, not in their technical, but their moral and ethical aspects. This includes the nature of private property, concerning which several conflicting views had developed within the Catholic Church. Pius XI proclaims private property to be essential for the development and freedom of the individual, which are Christian values not to be denied. But, says Pius, private property has a social function as well, and it loses its moral value if it is not subordinated to the common good. Therefore, governments have a right to pursue redistribution policies, and in extreme cases to expropriate private property.

Capital and labour
A related issue, says Pius, is the relation between capital and labour and the determination of fair wages. The Church considers it a perversion in industrial society to have fiercely opposed factions based on income. He welcomes all attempts to alleviate this strife and ameliorate its causes. Three elements determine a fair wage: The worker's family responsibilities, the economic condition of the enterprise and the economy as a whole. The family has an innate right to development, but this is only possible within the framework of a functioning economy and sound enterprises. For this, Pius XI concludes that solidarity, not conflict, is a necessary condition given the mutual interdependence of the parties involved.

Social order

Industrialization, says Pius XI, resulted in less freedom at the individual and communal level, because numerous free social entities were absorbed by larger ones. A society of individuals became a mass and class society. Today, people are much less interdependent than in ancient times and become egoistic or class-conscious in order to recover some freedom for themselves. The pope demands more solidarity, especially between employers and employees through new forms of cooperation and communication. Pius draws a negative view of capitalism, especially of the anonymous international finance markets. He deplores that small and medium-size enterprises with insufficient access to capital markets are often squeezed or destroyed by big business. He warns that capital interests can endanger states, potentially reducing them to "chained slaves of individual interests". The encyclical has been an important inspiration to modern distributist thought on seeking greater solidarity and subsidiarity than present capitalism.

Pius mostly reaffirms the importance of traditional gender roles, emphasizing the importance of a family wage for fathers:

Communism and socialism
Regarding communism and socialism, Pius XI notes increasing differences. He condemns communism but also the social conditions which nourish it. He wants moderate socialism to distance itself from totalitarian communism as a practical matter and also on principle, in light of the dignity of the human person. Dignity and human freedom are ethical considerations which cannot be ensured by hostile class confrontation. Ethics are based on religion and this is the realm where the Church meets industrial society.

117 "Whether considered as a doctrine, or an historical fact, or a movement, Socialism, if it remains truly Socialism, even after it has yielded to truth and justice on the points which we have mentioned, cannot be reconciled with the teachings of the Catholic Church because its concept of society itself is utterly foreign to Christian truth."

118 "Socialism, on the other hand, wholly ignoring and indifferent to this sublime end of both man and society, affirms that human association has been instituted for the sake of material advantage alone."

Reception
Ramsay MacDonald, the head of the British affiliate of the Socialist International, inquired of Cardinal Bourne, Archbishop of Westminster, on how the encyclical's statements on socialism applied to Catholics voting for or participating in socialist parties. The Cardinal stated "There is nothing in the encyclical which should deter Catholics from becoming members of the British Labour Party."

Franklin D. Roosevelt had high praise for the encyclical and quoted it extensively on the evils of concentrated economic power.

Notes

Further reading

External links
Notable Quotations from Quadragesimo anno

Documents of the Catholic Social Teaching tradition
Encyclicals of Pope Pius XI
1931 documents
1931 in Christianity
May 1931 events
Distributism